Harold "Harry" Brigham (born 1914) was an English footballer who played in the Football League for Nottingham Forest, Stoke City and York City.

Career
Born in Selby, West Riding of Yorkshire, Brigham started his career at Bolton Wanderers as an amateur before playing for Frickley Colliery. Following persistent overtures from Stoke City, he eventually joined Football League side in May 1936. He went on make 104 appearances in the Football League for Stoke as well as 216 in the wartime league. He also played for Chester and Wrexham as a wartime guest. He left in November 1946 just after the end of the war to join Nottingham Forest for a fee of £4,000, where he made 35 league appearances. He went on to sign for York City in July 1948. After making 60 appearances and scoring six goals in all competitions he signed for Gainsborough Trinity in June 1950, before finishing his career with hometown club Selby Town.

Career statistics

References

1914 births
People from Selby
1978 deaths
English footballers
Association football defenders
Bolton Wanderers F.C. players
Frickley Athletic F.C. players
Stoke City F.C. players
Nottingham Forest F.C. players
York City F.C. players
Gainsborough Trinity F.C. players
Selby Town F.C. players
English Football League players
Stoke City F.C. wartime guest players
Chester City F.C. wartime guest players
Wrexham F.C. wartime guest players
Sportspeople from Yorkshire